"Por Fin" ("Finally") is a song recorded by Spanish singer-songwriter Pablo Alborán. The song was released as the first single from his third studio album Terral (2014). The song was written by Alborán and produced by Eric Rosse. "Por Fin" is a soft rock ballad. Alborán received a nomination for Song of the Year at the 16th Latin Grammy Awards.

Chart performance

Weekly Charts

Year-end charts

See also
 List of number-one singles of 2014 (Spain)

References 

2014 singles
Pablo Alborán songs
Number-one singles in Spain
2014 songs
Songs written by Pablo Alborán
Warner Music Spain singles